Kinson Cemetery is a municipal cemetery in Kinson, a suburb of Bournemouth, England. The cemetery is owned by Bournemouth, Christchurch and Poole Council.

The cemetery has a section maintained by the Commonwealth War Graves Commission containing 4 burials from the Second World War.

History 
In 2009, Kinson Cemetery had Bournemouth's first dedicated Muslim burial area.

The Jewish section was actively in use from 1955 to 2005.

Burials 

 Peter George Davis (1923–2011), Royal Marines officer
 Sir Roy Welensky (1907–1991), Prime Minister of Rhodesia, 1956–1963

Gallery

References 

Cemeteries in Dorset
Bournemouth
Commonwealth War Graves Commission cemeteries in England
1936 establishments in England